Yousaf Khan or Yousuf Khan may refer to:

People
Yusaf Khan (general) (born 1948), former Pakistan Army general and vice chief of army staff
Yusuf Khan and Sherbano, Pashtun folklore akin to Romeo and Juliet
Yousuf Khan (actor) (died 2009), Pakistani film actor
Yousuf Khan (cricketer) (born 2002), Afghan cricketer
Yousuf Khan (footballer) (1937–2006), former Indian soccer player
Dilip Kumar (born Yusuf Khan, 1922–2021), Indian actor
Yusuf Khan (actor) (died 1985), Indian actor, father of actor Faraz Khan
Yousaf Ali Khan, British film director
Yousuf Hussain Khan (1902–1976), historian, scholar and author
Muhammed Yusuf Khan (1725–1764), Tamil soldier and later commandant of British East India Company troops

Fictional characters
Yusuf Khan (Marvel Cinematic Universe), from Ms. Marvel
Yusef Khan, from EastEnders

Other
Yusef Khan, Iran, village in Iran

Khan, Yousaf